The Upstarts were a group of supervillains appearing in American comic books published by Marvel Comics. The characters have strong ties to the Hellfire Club. They first appeared in Uncanny X-Men #281 and were created by Jim Lee and Whilce Portacio.

Fictional team biography
The Upstarts were part of a secret competition founded by Selene, the Black Queen of the Hellfire Club, who wanted to test potential members for her own Inner Circle. Overseen by the Gamesmaster, the Upstarts would each try to kill as many mutants as possible and the Gamesmaster would award points based on the mutant's power, skills and general importance in the world. At times he would raise the value of certain mutants so that the Upstarts would all try to assassinate them. At other times Gamesmaster would also reward the death of non-mutants. To gain entry to the Upstarts competition the requirement was to kill a member of the Inner Circle of the Hellfire Club, but later members were not required to do so; usually the Gamesmaster claimed that their participation would make the game more interesting. The member with the most points at the end of the competition would win "the prize". It was never explicitly stated what the prize was (though a statement by Andrea Strucker in X-Men #4 and a notation on the back of the Upstarts' X-Men Series I trading card state that the prize was immortality), but it was inferred that the winner would gain control over the other contestants as well as gain a lot of power and influence.

Shinobi Shaw took the early lead by killing his father Sebastian Shaw. He celebrated with a group of contestants who were never seen again afterwards. The time-traveller Trevor Fitzroy gained membership with the deaths of Donald Pierce and the Reavers. He demanded the ring that signified leadership of the Upstarts from Shaw, but Shaw refused, claiming that he still had more points. Fitzroy would go on to kill the Hellions, but  Fabian Cortez applied for membership and immediately took first place in the competition for the death of Magneto.

The German twins Fenris tried to join the competition and gain an advantage by resurrecting Omega Red. Their plan failed though and they were named only probational members by the Gamesmaster. Graydon Creed joined as well, using the moniker Tribune, and despite not succeeding killing anyone, the Gamesmaster gave him full membership. Trevor Fitzroy had met a woman in the future, named Sienna Blaze, who had told him where she would be one day. Fitzroy knew that Blaze had incredible mutant powers and told her that the Gamesmaster invited her to join the Upstarts.

Over the next few months, the Upstarts would try to kill as many mutants and other important people (like Moira MacTaggert) as possible, but with no success. In an attempt to reinvigorate the competition, the Gamesmaster started the Younghunt: the new targets were all surviving members of the New Mutants and Hellions. Instead of killing them, the Gamesmaster demanded that they should capture the targets. This competition brought the Upstarts into conflict with the New Warriors and X-Force. At the end of the game, the Upstarts had captured most of their targets, but Paige Guthrie convinced the Gamesmaster to play another game: instead of killing mutants, the Upstarts should try to find and train young mutants like herself. The Gamesmaster was intrigued and cancelled the competition. The Upstarts disbanded shortly afterwards.

Reemergence
Years later the Upstarts resurfaced to start the game that they created long ago. This new incarnation was made of long deceased mutants, Fabian Cortez, Shinobi Shaw, Siena Blaze and Trevor Fitzroy. They killed members of the Nasty Boys in order to lure out Cyclops and his ragtag team of X-Men to Washington Heights. After a brief moment of words, the two groups engaged each other in battle. The X-Men gained the upperhand as the Upstarts retreated but Shinobi was left behind. Not wanting to get captured, Shaw mentioned that he wasn't going to be controlled by the Hellfire Club so he phased his hand into head and then solidified it resulting in his death.

Members
 Gamesmaster (arbiter): An omnipath, who was in constant telepathic contact with the complete human population. To stop himself from going insane, he needed a distraction and became the judge of the competition.
 Selene: Came up with the idea of the Upstarts to use them against the other members of the Hellfire Club's Inner Circle and then choose the best to form a new Inner Circle. However, Fitzroy captured and tortured her to gain the attention of the Gamesmaster, therefore ruining her plans to reform the Inner Circle.
 Fabian Cortez: Gained points for the death of Magneto, but he lost his points when Magneto turned out to be alive. He left the competition shortly afterwards when Exodus nearly killed him.
 Shinobi Shaw: Gained points for the death of his father Sebastian Shaw. By the time of the Younghunt he was no longer interested in the competition and used Justice as his agent. 
 Trevor Fitzroy: Gained points for the deaths of Donald Pierce, the Reavers and the Hellions. He also claimed points for Emma Frost, but the Gamesmaster didn't award them, because Frost was in a coma and not dead. 
 Siena Blaze: Gained points for an attempt to kill Cyclops, Professor X and Storm, despite failing to actually kill them. 
 Tribune (Graydon Creed): Tried to kill Sabretooth and Mystique for personal reasons, but failed. Received no points in the competition.
 Fenris (probational members): Had two unsuccessful attempts to join. During the Younghunt they tried to capture Wolfsbane, but were captured by X-Factor.

Notes
 In early appearances, Shinobi Shaw has a group of people with him, whom he calls the Upstarts. These people are not seen again and never took any action in the competition.
 Nearly all the Upstarts' victims have since returned alive; only the Hellions remain dead (except for Tarot)
 At whatever point the Upstarts' competition was to be completed and a final winner declared, Selene had promised to the winner the prize of immortality.
 While not technically a member, Matsu'o Tsurayaba once petitioned the Gamesmaster for the right to kill Psylocke, which he was granted (to the chagrin of Shinobi Shaw). This was most likely an attempt by Tsurayaba to keep her alive until he could fully restore his lover, Kwannon, whose body had been switched with Psylocke's at the time.

References

Marvel Comics supervillain teams
X-Men supporting characters